Bandor-e Olya (also Romanized as Bāndor-e ‘Olyā; also known as Bandarābād-e Bālā, Bāndarābād-e ‘Olyā, Bāyandor, and Bāyandor-e ‘Olyā) is a village in Mansuri Rural District, Homeyl District, Eslamabad-e Gharb County, Kermanshah Province, Iran. At the 2006 census, its population was 242, in 58 families.

References 

Populated places in Eslamabad-e Gharb County